Borys Gudziak (born 24 November 1960) is the current Metropolitan-Archbishop of the Ukrainian Catholic Archeparchy of Philadelphia. He founded the Institute of Church History and served as the rector and president of the Ukrainian Catholic University. He was previously ordained as a priest, and later a bishop. Gudziak has authored and edited several books on church history, theology, modern church life, and higher education reforms.

Early life and education
Gudziak was born in Syracuse, New York, United States. His parents, both Ukrainian Greek Catholics, were World War II refugees. They come to New York from western Ukraine via Austria and Germany in 1949 and 1950. After completing his pre-university studies at Christian Brothers Academy, he graduated from Syracuse University, obtaining a dual degree in philosophy and biology in 1980. He entered the College of Saint Sophia in Rome where, as a student of the Lviv Archeparchy under Cardinal Josyf Slipyj, he attended the Pontifical Urban University. In 1983 he graduated in theology and began doctoral studies in an interdepartmental program of Slavic and Byzantine Cultural History at Harvard University, where he received his Ph.D. in 1992. His thesis, Crisis and Reform: The Kyivan Metropolitanate, the Patriarchate of Constantinople, and the Genesis of the Union of Brest, was published by the Harvard Ukrainian Research Institute in 1998.

From October 1994 until July 1995 he attended the Pontifical Oriental Institute, examining in particular the synthesis of neopatristic Orthodox theologian Georges Florovsky and receiving licentiate in Eastern Christian Studies.

Priest
In 1992, he moved permanently to Lviv, Ukraine, where he founded the Institute of Church History (ISC), becoming its director until October 2002. In 1993 he was appointed chairman of the Commission for the Renewal of the Lviv Theological Academy by Archbishop Myroslav Ivan Lubachivsky. From 1995 until 2000 he served as vice rector of the Lviv Theological Academy, then as rector from 2000 to 2002. In that year, Gudziak became rector of the Ukrainian Catholic University (founded on the basis of the academy), and since 2013 has served as its president.

He was ordained on 26 November 1998 in the Cathedral of St. George in Lviv by Bishop Sofron (Mudry) and incardinated in the Major Archeparchy of Lviv of the Ukrainians. He is the author of over 50 studies on the history of the Church, theological training and on different topics of cultural relevance.

Bishop
On 21 July 2012 it was announced that Pope Benedict XVI accepted the resignation of Michel Hrynchyshyn from the pastoral Apostolic Exarchate for Ukrainians of the Byzantine rite in France, and appointed Gudziak apostolic exarch for the Ukrainian faithful of the Byzantine rite in France, at the same time appointing him Titular Bishop of Carcabia. He was ordained a bishop on 26 August 2012 and installed in a Divine Liturgy on 2 December 2012.

On January 19, 2013, Benedict XVI elevated the Apostolic Exarchate of France, Benelux and Switzerland for the Ukrainians to the status of a full apostolic eparchy (the equivalent of a diocese), and named it after Saint Vladimir. Gudziak, though already an ordained bishop, is now an ordinary bishop (or head, of a fully established Eastern diocese), instead of an exarch. He ceased to be a titular bishop since he is now an ordinary bishop.

At the time Gudziak was the 49th member of the Synod of Bishops of the Ukrainian Greek Catholic Church. Besides France, the eparchy also serves Belgium, the Netherlands, Luxembourg, and Switzerland.

In May 2018, Gudziak received an honorary doctorate of humane letters degree during the 164th commencement of Syracuse University.

On February 18, 2019, Pope Francis has appointed Gudziak as Ukrainian Catholic Archbishop of Philadelphia and Metropolitan for the Ukrainian Catholic Church in USA and thus concurring with the recommendation of the appointment offered by the Synod of Ukrainian Catholic Bishops, which met in September 2018 in Lviv, Ukraine.  He was installed on June 4, 2019. On June 4, 2019, Metropolitan Archbishop Gudziak was enthroned as the head of the Ukrainian Catholic Archeparchy of Philadelphia at the Ukrainian Catholic Cathedral of the Immaculate Conception in Philadelphia, PA.

Pope Francis named him a member of the Congregation for the Oriental Churches on August 6, 2019. In 2021 Pope Francis had appointed Metropolitan Borys Gudziak as a member of the Dicastery for Communications.

In May 2022, he was the commencement speaker at the University of Notre Dame's 177th commencement ceremony. In 2021, Archbishop Gudziak was the commencement speaker during Saint Charles Borromeo Seminary's 2021 Concursus

Scientific, editorial, teaching and administrative activities 
Author and editor of books and articles on church-historical, spiritual, and theological topics in different languages, as well as texts on modern church life, development and reform of higher education, spirituality of architecture, and other relevant issues of public, social, cultural and political life. His most important publication is "The Kyivan Metropolitanate, the Patriarchate of Constantinople, and the Genesis of the Union of Brest"

Co-founder and co-editor of the church history journal "The Ark" (1993). Member of the Editorial Board of the journal «Logos: A Journal of Eastern Christian Studies» Ottawa, Canada (1994). Member of the Scientific Council of the journal «Oecumanica Civitas Rivista del Centro di documentazione del Movimento Ecumenico Italiano" in Livorno, Italia (2001). Scientific editor of the translation of John Paul II's book "Memory and Identity" (2005).

Awards 
 Antonovych prize (2006)
 Notre Dame Award presented by the University of Notre Dame (June 2019)

See also
 Catholic Church hierarchy
 Catholic Church in the United States
 Historical list of the Catholic bishops of the United States
 List of Catholic bishops of the United States
 Lists of patriarchs, archbishops, and bishops

References

External links

 Archeparchy of Philadelphia

Episcopal succession

Living people
1960 births
Pontifical Urban University alumni
American Eastern Catholic bishops
Archbishops of the Ukrainian Greek Catholic Church
American people of Ukrainian descent
Religious leaders from Syracuse, New York
Syracuse University College of Arts and Sciences alumni
American theologians
Harvard Graduate School of Arts and Sciences alumni
Pontifical Oriental Institute alumni
Eastern Catholic archeparchs in North America